USS George Washington Carver (SSBN-656), a  fleet ballistic missile submarine, was the second ship of the United States Navy to be named for George Washington Carver (1865–1943), an American researcher and inventor.

Construction and commissioning
The contract for George Washington Carvers construction was awarded on 29 July 1963, and her keel was laid down on 24 August 1964 by the Newport News Shipbuilding and Dry Dock Company at Newport News, Virginia. She was launched on 14 August 1965, sponsored by African-American contralto Marian Anderson (1897–1993), and commissioned on 15 June 1966 with Captain R. D. Donavan in command of the Blue Crew and Lieutenant Commander Carl J. Lidel in command of the Gold Crew.

Service history

Following shakedown, George Washington Carver'''s began her first strategic deterrent patrol on 12 December 1966. She operated out of Holy Loch, Scotland until September, 1971, when she transferred to Groton, Conn. for two months of special operations before entering the shipyard at Electric Boat Div., Groton, Conn. in November, 1971, for reactor refueling and overhaul. George Washington Carver was in dry dock at Naval Station Rota, Spain for overhaul beginning February 1977. A team from Electric Boat Div. Groton, CT was deployed to complete the overhaul/refit.History needed for 1966-1991.Conversion of missile tubes

In 1991, George Washington Carver's ballistic missile had missiles removed and tubes were filled with ballast at Naval Weapons Station, Charleston, SC. The submarine and crew then received a change of homeport to Naval Submarine Base, Bangor, WA and assisted on the west coast in various assignments before finally entering the Puget Sound Naval Shipyard at Bremerton, Washington.History needed for 1991-1993.Decommissioning and disposalGeorge Washington Carver'' was both decommissioned and stricken from the Naval Vessel Register on 18 March 1993 at the Puget Sound Naval Shipyard in Bremerton, Washington, where her scrapping via the U.S. Navys Ship and Submarine Recycling Program was completed on 12 March 1994.

References 

 

Benjamin Franklin-class submarines
Cold War submarines of the United States
1965 ships
Ships built in Newport News, Virginia